Bryan Andrés Carvallo Utreras (born 15 September 1996) is a Chilean professional footballer who currently plays for Everton de Viña del Mar as a attacking midfielder.

Club career
A product of Colo-Colo youth system, he began playing for Colo-Colo B in the Segunda División Profesional. In September 2018, he moved to Mexico and joined Necaxa in the Liga MX. After ending his contract with Necaxa, in 2022 he joined Unión La Calera. On second half 2022, he joined Everton de Viña del Mar by second time after his step in 2019.

International career
He represented Chile at under-17 level in the 2013 South American Championship and Chile at under-20 level in the 2015 South American Championship.

Honours

Club
Colo-Colo
 Primera División (1): 2014 Clausura

References

External links
 
 Carvallo at Football-Lineups

1996 births
Living people
People from Cachapoal Province
Chilean footballers
Chile youth international footballers
Chile under-20 international footballers
Chilean expatriate footballers
Association football forwards
Colo-Colo B footballers
Colo-Colo footballers
C.D. Antofagasta footballers
Club Necaxa footballers
Everton de Viña del Mar footballers
Universidad de Concepción footballers
Unión La Calera footballers
Segunda División Profesional de Chile players
Chilean Primera División players
Liga MX players
Expatriate footballers in Mexico
Chilean expatriate sportspeople in Mexico
2015 South American Youth Football Championship players